Radenko Kamberović (Serbian Cyrillic: Раденко Камберовић; born 13 February 1983) is a Serbian former professional footballer who played as a defender.

Playing career 
Kamberović began his career in 2001 in the Second League of FR Yugoslavia with Remont Čačak. In 2003, he played in the First League of FR Yugoslavia with OFK Beograd. During his time with Beograd he was loaned out to Macva Sabac, and BASK. In 2006, he signed with FK Sevojno of the Serbian First League, where Sevojno reached the finals of the Serbian Cup which qualified them for the 2009–10 UEFA Europa League. Throughout the tournament he featured in the matches against FBK Kaunas, and Lille OSC.

In 2010, he played in the Serbian SuperLiga with FK Partizan. During his tenure with Partizan he mostly saw action during his loan to Borac Cacak. At the conclusion of the Superliga he went across the border to play in the Montenegrin First League with FK Budućnost Podgorica, where he won the 2012–13 Montenegrin Cup. He played in the 2012–13 UEFA Champions League against Śląsk Wrocław, he returned to Serbia in order to play with FK Jedinstvo Užice, and FK Sloga Kraljevo.

He went overseas to Canada in 2015 to play with the Serbian White Eagles in the Canadian Soccer League. In his second season with the club, he won the CSL Championship after defeating Hamilton City SC.

Honours
Sevojno
 Serbian Cup: Runner-up 2008–09
Partizan
 Serbian SuperLiga: 2009–10
Serbian White Eagles
 CSL Championship: 2016

References

External links
 
 

Association football defenders
Canadian Soccer League (1998–present) players
Expatriate footballers in Montenegro
Expatriate soccer players in Canada
FK BASK players
FK Borac Čačak players
FK Budućnost Podgorica players
FK Mačva Šabac players
FK Remont Čačak players
FK Sevojno players
FK Sloboda Užice players
FK Sloga Kraljevo players
Montenegrin First League players
OFK Beograd players
People from Bajina Bašta
Serbian expatriate footballers
Serbian expatriate sportspeople in Canada
Serbian expatriate sportspeople in Montenegro
Serbian First League players
Serbian footballers
Serbian SuperLiga players
Serbian White Eagles FC players
1983 births
Living people